Arthur Gay Payne, who also wrote under the pseudonym Phillis Browne (7 February 1840, Camberwell – 1 April 1894, Penzance) was an English sports editor and writer on cookery.

Biography

The son of John Robert Payne, Payne was educated at University College School and Peterhouse, Cambridge. There he coxed his college boat. A friend of the athlete J. G. Chambers, he advised and helped the swimmer Matthew Webb (editing his Art of Swimming in 1875). From 1871 to 1883 he was the sporting editor of the Standard, He also edited The Billiard News from 1875 to 1878, and was assistant editor of Land and Water until 1883. He contributed to Bell's Life in London, Girl's Own, and Cassell's Popular Recreation (writing on conjuring and cricket).

Payne was not a vegetarian but authored an early vegetarian cookbook Cassell's Vegetarian Cookery in 1891.

Works
(ed.) Art of Swimming, by Matthew Webb, 1875
(ed.) Cassell's Dictionary of Cookery, 1875-6
Common Sense Cooking, 1877
Choice Dishes at Small Cost, 1882

(ed.) Billiards, by W. Cook, 1884
Cassell's Shilling cookery, 1888
Cassell's Vegetarian Cookery, 1891
Cookery for Common Ailments, 1905
Practical Home Cookery, 1906

References

Frederic Boase, Modern English Biography

External links

 
 
 
 

1840 births
1894 deaths
British sports journalists
Diet food advocates
English food writers
English male non-fiction writers
English sportswriters
English non-fiction writers
People educated at University College School
Alumni of Peterhouse, Cambridge